Mont Shefford is a Monteregian Hill located in Shefford in the Estrie region of Quebec, Canada.

Geology
Mount Shefford was formed some 125 million years ago during an underground intrusion of magma. This magma did not reach the earth's surface and remained in a deep freeze. The mountain appeared following the erosion of nearby sedimentary rocks by glaciers. The sedimentary rock was more fragile than the metamorphic rock formed by the contact of the magma and the surrounding sedimentary rock.

Mountains of Quebec under 1000 metres
Mont Shefford
Igneous petrology of Quebec
Stocks (geology)
La Haute-Yamaska Regional County Municipality